Granigyra tenera is a species of sea snail, a marine gastropod mollusk, unassigned in the superfamily Seguenzioidea.

Description
The shell grows to a height of 1.8 mm.
The thin shell is narrowly umbilicated. It is semitransparent, lustreless, with nearly microscopic spiral stride, which are wanting on the base and replaced by a rugose or fretted appearance. The color of the shell is pale yellowish white, with a faint greenish tinge. The four whorls are convex. The suture is very deep. The aperture is circular. The thin peristome is slightly expanded.

Distribution
This species occurs in the Atlantic Ocean off Portugal.

References

 Gofas, S.; Le Renard, J.; Bouchet, P. (2001). Mollusca, in: Costello, M.J. et al. (Ed.) (2001). European register of marine species: a check-list of the marine species in Europe and a bibliography of guides to their identification. Collection Patrimoines Naturels, 50: pp. 180–213

External links
  Serge GOFAS, Ángel A. LUQUE, Joan Daniel OLIVER,José TEMPLADO & Alberto SERRA (2021) - The Mollusca of Galicia Bank (NE Atlantic Ocean); European Journal of Taxonomy 785: 1–114

tenera
Gastropods described in 1883